The Blood Barrier is a 1920 American silent drama film directed by J. Stuart Blackton and starring Sylvia Breamer, Robert Gordon, and William R. Dunn.

Cast
 Sylvia Breamer as Enid Solari 
 Robert Gordon as Major Robert Trevor 
 William R. Dunn as Eugene Solari 
 Eddie Dunn as Eddie Brown 
 Louis Dean as Zu Paven 
 Margaret Barry as Madame Marechek 
 Gus Alexander as 'Left'

References

Bibliography
 Wesley Alan Britton. Onscreen and Undercover: The Ultimate Book of Movie Espionage. Greenwood, 2006.

External links

1920 films
1920 drama films
Silent American drama films
Films directed by J. Stuart Blackton
American silent feature films
1920s English-language films
Pathé Exchange films
American black-and-white films
1920s American films